Alan Gray is a British organist and composer.

Alan Gray may also refer to:

Alan Gray (footballer) (born 1974), English footballer

See also
Alan Gray Martin (born 1930), Liberal party member of the Canadian House of Commons
Allan Gray (disambiguation), other people named Allan Gray
Alan Grey, New Zealand rower